The wheelchair curling competition of the 2014 Winter Paralympics was held from 8 to 15 March 2014 at the Ice Cube Curling Center in Sochi, Russia. Ten mixed teams competed.

Qualification
Qualification for the 2014 Paralympics was based on rankings in the 2011, 2012, and 2013 World Wheelchair Curling Championships. The qualification points are allotted based on the nations' final rankings at the World Championships. The points are distributed as shown in the table below. The nine countries with the most points were to qualify for the Sochi Games, while the tenth slot was reserved for the host country, Russia. Because the Russian team placed within the top nine point-scorers, the tenth slot was given to the tenth-ranked team, Finland.

Standings

Medal table

Teams
The teams are listed as follows:

Round-robin standings

Round-robin results
All draw times are listed in Moscow Time (UTC+4).

Draw 1
Saturday, March 8, 9:30

Draw 2
Saturday, March 8, 15:30

Draw 3
Sunday, March 9, 9:30

Draw 4
Sunday, March 9, 15:30

Draw 5
Monday, March 10, 9:30

Draw 6
Monday, March 10, 15:30

Draw 7
Tuesday, March 11, 9:30

Draw 8
Tuesday, March 11, 15:30

Draw 9
Wednesday, March 12, 9:30

Draw 10
Wednesday, March 12, 15:30

Draw 11
Thursday, March 13, 9:30

Draw 12
Thursday, March 13, 15:30

Playoffs

Semifinals
Saturday, March 15, 9:30

Bronze medal game
Saturday, March 15, 15:30

Gold medal game
Saturday, March 15, 15:30

References

External links

 Video:
 
 

 
2014
2014 Winter Paralympics events
Winter Paralympics
International curling competitions hosted by Russia